5-Aza-7-deazaguanine or 2-aminoimidazo[1,2-a][1,3,5]triazin-4(1H)-one is a 5-Aza-7-deazapurine base that is an isomer of guanine. It is used as a nucleobase of hachimoji DNA, in which it pairs with 6-Amino-5-nitropyridin-2-one.

References 

Nitrogen heterocycles
Nucleobases